The 2001 Men's Hockey Champions Challenge took place in Kuala Lumpur, Malaysia from December 7 to December 15, 2001.

Participating nations were Argentina, Belgium, host Malaysia, India, Japan, and South Africa. The winner earned a spot at the 2002 Champions Trophy in Cologne, Germany.

India defeated South Africa 2–1 in the final to win the competition.


Squads

Head Coach: Jorge Ruiz

Head Coach: Cedric d'Souza

Head Coach: Paul Lissek

Head Coach: Rob Pullen

Results

Pool

Classification

Fifth place game

Third place game

Final

Statistics

Final ranking

Awards

See also
2001 Men's Hockey Champions Trophy

External links
 1st Men's Challenge Hockey from Rediff.com
Official FIH Reports

Champions Challenge
Hockey Champions Challenge
International field hockey competitions hosted by Malaysia
Men's Hockey Champions Challenge I
Hockey Champions Challenge
Sports competitions in Kuala Lumpur
2000s in Kuala Lumpur